Armin Grau (born 18 March 1959) is a German physician and politician of the Green Party who has been serving as a member of the Bundestag since the 2021 elections.

Political career
Grau became a member of the Bundestag in the 2021 elections, representing the Ludwigshafen/Frankenthal district. In parliament, he has since been serving on the Health Committee and the Committee on the Environment, Nature Conservation, Nuclear Safety and Consumer Protection.

In addition to his committee assignments, Grau has been one of the founding members of a cross-party group promoting a One Health approach since 2022.

Other activities
 German Federation for the Environment and Nature Conservation (BUND), Member

References

External links 
 

Living people
1959 births
Politicians from Stuttgart
21st-century German politicians
Members of the Bundestag for Alliance 90/The Greens
Members of the Bundestag 2021–2025
20th-century German people